Jared Palmer and Pavel Vízner were the defending champions, but they chose not to participate.

Satoshi Iwabuchi and Takao Suzuki won the title by defeating Simon Aspelin and Todd Perry 5–4(7–3), 5–4(15–13) in the final.

Seeds

Draw

Draw

References
 Main Draw

2005 Japan Open Tennis Championships